Jaume Blassi (born 1948) is a Spanish photographer. 

Their work is included in the collections of Museo Reina Sofia, Madrid, the Metropolitan Museum of Art, the Detroit Institute of Arts, and the Museum of Fine Arts Houston.

References

Living people
1948 births
20th-century Spanish artists
21st-century Spanish artists
20th-century photographers
21st-century photographers